Bradley Land was the name Frederick Cook gave to a mass of land which he claimed to have seen between  and  during a 1909 expedition. He described it as two masses of land with a break, a strait, or an indentation between. The land was named for John R. Bradley, who had sponsored Cook's expedition.

Cook published two photographs of the land and described it thus: "The lower coast resembled Heiberg Island, with mountains and high valleys. The upper coast I estimated as being about one thousand feet high, flat, and covered with a thin sheet ice."

It is now known there is no land at that location and Cook's observations were based on either a misidentification of sea ice or an outright fabrication.  Cook's Inuit companions reported that the photographs were actually taken near the coast of Axel Heiberg Island.

See also
 Crocker Land
 Sannikov Land

References

Phantom Arctic islands
Exploration of the Arctic